Hymenobacter yonginensis  is a non-motile bacterium from the genus of Hymenobacter which has been isolated from a mesotrophic lake near the campus of Hankuk University of Foreign Studies in Yongin in Korea.

References 

yonginensis
Bacteria described in 2011